The 2017 South Australian National Football League (SANFL) grand final was played at the Adelaide Oval on Sunday, 24 September to determine the premiers for the 2017 SANFL season.

The Grand Final was contested by Port Adelaide and Sturt and was the first time the two teams played each other in the SANFL Grand Final since 1998.

Sturt defeated Port Adelaide by just 1 point, to record their second consecutive premiership and 15th overall.

It was the best possible finish to the season for Sturt, which became the first SANFL club to win the Under-18, Reserves and first grade premierships in the same season.

Scorecard

References 

SANFL Grand Finals
SANFL Grand Final, 2017